Suri Wasi (Quechua suri rhea, wasi house, "rhea house", Hispanicized spelling Surihuasi) is a  mountain in the Andes of Peru. It is located in the Arequipa Region, Arequipa Province, Tarucani District, and in the Moquegua Region, General Sánchez Cerro Province, Ubinas District. Suri Wasi lies southeast of the lakes Chinaqucha and Urququcha.

References 

Mountains of Arequipa Region
Mountains of Moquegua Region
Mountains of Peru